Dervaes is a surname. Notable people with the surname include: 

Joseph Dervaes (1906–1986), Belgian racing cyclist
Jules Dervaes (1947–2016), American urban farmer